Gerhard Lauer (born November 14, 1962) is a German literary scholar. He is currently Professor of Digital Humanities at the University of Basel. He has worked on literary history and digital humanities.

Lauer initially studied literary studies, philosophy and musicology at the Saarland University and University of Tübingen, and completed his undergraduate degree at the University of Munich. He then trained in German studies and Jewish studies. He went on to complete his Doctor of Philosophy in 1992 on the history of scholarship in exile with Wolfgang Frühwald as his doctoral supervisor. In 2000 he defended his habilitation on the rise of the Haskalah.

In 2002 he succeeded Wilfried Barner, who had succeeded Albrecht Schöne in 1992, as chair of Modern German Literature at the University of Göttingen. Professor Lauer is a member of the Göttingen Academy of Sciences and Humanities, was distinguished Max Kade visiting professor at the Washington University in St. Louis, senior research fellow at the Institut of Advances Studies/St Mary's College, Durham University, is a cofounding editor of the Journal of Literary Theory and associate editor of the journal Scientific Study of Literature.

Works 

 Die verspätete Revolution. Erich Kahler. Wissenschaftsgeschichte zwischen konservativer Revolution und Exil. De Gruyter 1995. 
 Rückkehr des Autors. Zur Erneuerung eines umstrittenen Begriffs (with Fotis Jannidis, Matias Martinez and Simone Winko. Niemeyer 1999. 
 Regeln der Bedeutung. Zur Theorie der Bedeutung literarischer Texte (with Fotis Jannidis, Matias Martinez and Simone Winko. De Gruyter 2003. 
 Exile, Science, and Bildung : The Contested Legacies of German Emigre Intellectuals (with David Kettler). Palgrave Macmillan 2005. 
 Das Erdbeben von Lissabon und der Katastrophendiskurs im 18. Jahrhundert (with Thorsten Unger). Wallstein 2008. 
 Die Rückseite der Haskala. Geschichte einer kleinen Aufklärung. Wallstein 2008. 
 Grenzen der Literatur. Zu Begriff und Phänomen des Literarischen (with Simone Winko and Fotis Jannidis. De Gruyter 2009.  
 Die Erfindung des Schriftstellers Thomas Mann (with Michael Ansel and Hans-Edwin Friedrich). De Gruyter 2009. 
 Literaturwissenschaftliche Beiträge zur Generationsforschung. Wallstein 2010. 
 Lexikon Literaturwissenschaft. Hundert Grundbegriffe (with Christine Ruhrberg). Reclam 2011. 
 Kunst und Empfindung. Zur Genealogie einer kunsttheoretischen Fragestellung in Deutschland und Frankreich im 18. Jahrhundert (with Elisabeth Décultot). Winter 2012. 
 Herder und die Künste. Ästhetik, Kunsttheorie, Kunstgeschichte (with Elisabeth Décultot). Winter 2013. 
 Constantin Brunner im Kontext. Ein Intellektueller zwischen Kaiserreich und Exil (with Irene Aue-Ben-David and Jürgen Stenzel). Oldenbourg 2014. 
 Wilhelm von Humboldt. Schriften zur Bildung. Stuttgart: Reclam 2017. 
 Johann Friedrich Blumenbach. Race and Natural History, 1750–1850 (with Nicolaas Rupke). Routledge 2019.

References

External links

 
 University website
 Göttingen Academy of Sciences

1962 births
Living people
Fellows of the Institute of Advanced Study (Durham)
German literary theorists
Ludwig Maximilian University of Munich alumni
Writers from Karlsruhe
Academic staff of the University of Göttingen
Washington University in St. Louis faculty
Saarland University alumni
University of Tübingen alumni